iTunes Session is an EP by American singer Kelly Clarkson. It was released on December 23, 2011 in Australia and on December 27, 2011 in the United States and the United Kingdom. In the United States, it peaked at number 85 on the Billboard 200, and has sold 17,000 copies as of September 2017.

Singles
The EP's release was preceded by a Christmas single, "I'll Be Home for Christmas." "I'll Be Home For Christmas" debuted on the Billboard Hot 100 at number 93 for the chart dated December 24, 2011 with 24,000 copies sold. It also charted at number sixteen on Billboard Holiday Songs and at number 61 on Billboard Hot Digital Songs. It was re-released to AC radio on November 27, 2012. The song was later included on the deluxe edition of her first holiday album, Wrapped in Red (2013), as a bonus track.

Track listing

Charts

Release history

References

External links
 

2011 EPs
2011 live albums
Live EPs
ITunes Session
Kelly Clarkson EPs
RCA Records EPs
19 Recordings EPs